This was the first edition of the event.

Yannick Noah won the title, beating Joakim Nyström 6–4, 7–5 in the final.

Seeds

Draw

Finals

Top half

Bottom half

References

 Main Draw

1987 Grand Prix (tennis)